Anicla digna is a moth of the family Noctuidae. It is found in North America, including Texas and South Carolina.

The wingspan is about 30 mm.

External links
Images

Noctuinae
Moths described in 1875
Moths of North America